Tether Cars are model racing cars powered by miniature internal combustion engines and tethered to a central post. Unlike radio control cars, the driver has no remote control over the model's speed or steering.

Basics

Tether cars are often small (less than 1 meter in length), powered by a non-radio controlled model aeroplane engine (two stroke, glow plug, piston liner, etc.), and run on fuel supplied by a fuel tank within the car. Since 2015, electric motor driven cars, powered by batteries, have also emerged.

History
Tether cars were developed beginning in the 1920s–1930s and still are built, raced and collected today. First made by hobby craftsmen, tether cars were later produced in small numbers by commercial manufacturers such as Dooling Brothers (California), Dick McCoy (Duro-Matic Products), Garold Frymire (Fryco Engineering) BB Korn, and many others. Original examples of the early cars, made from 1930s to the 1960s, are avidly collected today and command prices in the thousands of dollars.

Locations and speed records
There are tracks in Australia (Brisbane and Sydney), New Zealand, Germany, Switzerland, Estonia, Ukraine, Russia, the United States, and other countries. World Championship races are held every 3 years, the 2013 World Championships was held in Basel, Switzerland.

World records

See also
 Cox Models, a former manufacturer of ready to run tether cars
 Control line flying model

References

External links
 Vintage Miniature Gas Powered Race Cars, Buys cars, private website covering the early history of tether cars
 AMRCA - American Miniature Racing Car Association
 WMCR - World Organisation for Model Car Racing
 GMBK - Gävle ModellBil Klubb

Toy cars and trucks